Glenn Hubbard may refer to:

Glenn Hubbard (baseball) (born 1957), American baseball player
Glenn Hubbard (economist) (born 1958), American academic specializing in tax policy and health care

See also
Hubbard (surname)